Woods Motor Vehicle Company was an American manufacturer of electric automobiles in Chicago, Illinois, between 1899 and 1916. In 1915 they produced the Dual Power (U.S. Patent # 1244045) with both electric and internal combustion engines which continued until 1918.

The company was started by Clinton Edgar Woods who literally "wrote the first book on electric vehicles." 

The 1904 Woods Stanhope was a stanhope model.  It could seat 2 passengers and sold for US$1800.  Twin electric motors, situated at the rear of the car, produced 2.5 hp (1.9 kW) each.  The car weighed 2650 lb (1202 kg) with a 40 cell battery.

The 1904 Woods Victoria was a carriage-styled model. It could seat 2 passengers and sold for US$1900. The same twin electric motors as the Stanhope were used, though a 4-speed transmission was fitted.

Founding
The Woods Motor Vehicle Company was founded on the 28th of September 1899 with a capitalization of $10,000,000. It was incorporated under the laws of New Jersey.  It assumed the  patents of the Fischer Equipment Company of Chicago and a factory at 110-120 East Twentieth St., Chicago with plans to upgrade another facility at 547 Wabash Avenue in Chicago for another factory.  Frederick Nichols of Toronto, Canada, was installed as the first president and C.E. Woods was installed as one of the company's directors.

Early hybrid
At $2,700, The Dual Power Model 44 Coupe  of 1911 to 1918 had a 4-cylinder internal combustion engine as well as electric power. It is today considered a historic hybrid electric vehicle.

Some sources wrongly state that the Woods Dual Power car manufactured by the Woods Motor Vehicle Company in Chicago also used the Entz transmission. The Woods Dual Power had a drive-train based on Roland Fend's U.S. patent number 1,303,870, using a clutch between the gas engine and the electric motor, allowing the engine to also drive the car through the armature shaft of the motor, which itself was connected to the driveshaft. The Woods car was similar in many ways to today’s hybrids. It used both a gasoline engine and an electric motor to propel the wheels, had regenerative braking to recharge the batteries and in some circumstances the car could charge the batteries while running on gasoline.

Patents
 : Automobile (dual propulsion units)

See also
List of defunct United States automobile manufacturers
History of the electric vehicle

Other Early Electric Vehicles
American Electric 
Argo Electric
Babcock Electric Carriage Company
Baker Motor Vehicle
Berwick
Binghamton Electric
Buffalo Electric
Century
Columbia Automobile Company
Dayton Electric
Detroit Electric
Grinnell
Menominee
Riker Electric
Studebaker Electric

References

 Frank Leslie's Popular Monthly (January, 1904)

Veteran vehicles
Brass Era vehicles
Electric vehicles introduced in the 20th century
Motor vehicle manufacturers based in Illinois
Defunct motor vehicle manufacturers of the United States
Defunct brands
Highwheeler
1900s cars
1910s cars